Beyers Johannes de Villiers (born ) is a former South African rugby union player, who played as a flanker. He retired in February 2017 on medical grounds.

Rugby career

Schoolboy and youth rugby

De Villiers was born in Pretoria, but grew up in the Western Cape province, where he attended Paarl Boys' High School. In 2010, De Villiers was selected to represent Western Province at the premier high school rugby union tournament in South Africa, the Under-18 Craven Week. He started in all three of their matches in the tournament held in Welkom, helping his side to two victories to secure a place in the unofficial final, which they lost to Free State.

De Villiers also played for Western Province youth teams after high school. In 2011, he was a key member of the  team that played in the Under-19 Provincial Championship, starting eleven of their thirteen matches during the competition. He helped his team qualify for the semi-finals, by finishing in third place on the Group A log, winning seven of their twelve matches. De Villiers also started in their semi-final match against the  team, but his team was eliminated at that stage as the team from Johannesburg won 32–27. In 2012, he progressed to their Under-21 team, starting four matches in the Under-21 Provincial Championship, scoring one try in a 31–20 victory over the s.

Varsity Cup and first class rugby

At the start of the 2013 season, De Villiers represented university side  in the Varsity Cup. Maties finished top of the log by winning all seven of their matches, qualifying for a home semi-final.

De Villiers again started six matches in 2015, scoring four tries – two in a 26–all draw against  and one against  and  – in a disappointing season for Maties, losing out on a semi-final berth by finishing in fourth place on the log.

The 2016 Varsity Cup saw an improvement of their fortunes, and they finished top, winning six of their seven matches during the regular season. He also started their semi-final match against  and scored two tries in a 49–11 win.

He was also named in their squad for the 2016 Currie Cup Premier Division, but failed to make an appearance in the competition.

De Villiers returned to Maties to play his fifth season in the competition in 2017, but suffered a concussion in the final five minutes of their opening match against  and made the decision to retire from the sport.

References

South African rugby union players
Living people
1992 births
Rugby union players from Pretoria
Rugby union flankers
Western Province (rugby union) players